Nymphonia zaleuca is a moth of the family Yponomeutidae. It is found in Australia.

External links
Australian Faunal Directory

Moths described in 1913
Yponomeutidae